Xyrias guineensis is an eel in the family Ophichthidae (worm/snake eels). It was described by Jacques Blache in 1975, originally under the genus Ophisurus. It is a marine, deep water-dwelling eel which is known from Pointe Noire, Congo, in the eastern Atlantic Ocean.

References

Ophichthidae
Fish described in 1975